La brújula rota (English: The broken compass) is a Mexican telenovela produced by Televisa and transmitted by Telesistema Mexicano.

Jorge Mistral and Ariadna Welter starred as protagonists, Guillermo Zetina starred as main antagonist.

Cast
 Jorge Mistral
 Ariadna Welter
 
 Guillermo Zetina
 Elda Peralta
 Andrea Palma
 Elsa Cárdenas
 Emilio Brillas
 Madaleine Vivo

References

External links 
 

Mexican telenovelas
1961 telenovelas
Televisa telenovelas
1961 Mexican television series debuts
1961 Mexican television series endings
Spanish-language telenovelas